Muan–Gwangju Expressway also known as 12th Expressway is an expressway in South Korea connecting Muan County to Gwangju.

Formerly, this route designated as part of the Olympic Expressway but on January 3, 2008, it was separated into two segments that shared the same designation number with Gwangju-Daegu Expressway.

History 
 November 8, 2007: Muan Airport IC - Naju IC (30.4 km) opened.
 May 28, 2008: Naju IC - Unsu IC (11 km) opened.
 September 29, 2009: West Gwangsan IC opened.

Compositions 
 Lanes 
 All section: 4 lanes

 Length
 41.35 km

 Speed limit
 100 km/h

Major stopovers 
 South Jeolla Province 
 Muan County (Mangun-myeon - Hyeongyeong-myeon - Muan-eup) - Hampyeong County (Hampyeong-eup - Eomda-myeon - Hakgyo-myeon - Daedong-myeon) - Naju (Munpyeong-myeon - Noan-myeon)

 Gwangju
 Gwangsan District (Dongsan-dong - Yonggok-dong - Yong-dong - Jijuk-dong - Seobong-dong - Seonam-dong - Unsu-dong)

List of facilities

IC: Interchange, JC: Junction, SA: Service Area, TG:Tollgate

See also 
Roads and expressways in South Korea
Transportation in South Korea

References

External links 
 Riding Muan-Gwangju Expressway
 MOLIT South Korean Government Transport Department

Expressways in South Korea
Transport in South Jeolla Province
Transport in Gwangju